Fusion is a 1988 shoot 'em up video game developed by Bullfrog Productions and published by Electronic Arts for the Atari ST and Amiga.

Gameplay
It is a multi-directional scrolling shoot 'em up game (with parallax scrolling). The action is viewed from the top. The player controls either a ground-based crawler or a spacecraft. There are thirteen levels.

Development
Fusion was created by Bullfrog Productions, a development studio founded by game designer Peter Molyneux. It was the company's first original product and second game overall, after a port of the shoot 'em up Druid II: Enlightenment. As with Druid II and the later Populous, artist Glenn Corpes created most of the graphics and animation for Fusion, while Molyneux handled the majority of its programming and design. The game was coded in assembly language, and the Atari ST version was developed using HiSoft Systems' Devpac II assembler. Its soundtrack, available on the double-sided disk release, was composed by David Hanlon. Fusion was released in 1988.

Reception

Matt Fox, author of The Video Games Guide, summarized Fusion as a "run-of-the-mill shoot 'em up [that] caused few ripples on release". According to Corpes, Fusion was not a commercial success and, together with Druid II, "only brought in a fraction of the money needed to pay the wage bill."

A UK magazine gave the ST version of Fusion a score of 9 out of 10, saying that despite being "yet another vertically scrolling shoot-'em-up" it has "sufficient variation". Bullfrog went on to develop Populous, Magic Carpet and other well-received titles.

References

External links
 Fusion at MobyGames

1988 video games
Amiga games
Atari ST games
Bullfrog Productions games
Electronic Arts games
Europe-exclusive video games
Scrolling shooters
Video games developed in the United Kingdom